William of Germany may refer to:
William II of Holland, medieval king of Germany (1247–56)
William I, German Emperor (1871–88)
Wilhelm II, German Emperor (1888–1918)